Antennaria anaphaloides, the pearly pussytoes, is a North American species of plants in the family Asteraceae.  It is native to western Canada (British Columbia, Alberta, Saskatchewan) and the western United States (primarily the Rocky Mountains, with additional populations in the Great Basin and northeastern part of the Colorado Plateau).

References

anaphaloides
Plants described in 1900
Flora of Western Canada
Flora of the Northwestern United States
Flora of the Southwestern United States